Brinson Partners (later known as UBS Brinson) was an asset management firm focused on providing access for U.S. institutions to global markets.  The firm was founded by noted investor Gary P. Brinson in the 1980s and established as an independent firm in 1989.  Brinson was acquired by Swiss Bank Corporation in 1994 and became the core of the Swiss bank's asset management business in the U.S.

The firm was headquartered in Chicago, Illinois and Swiss Bank Corporation's successor, UBS still maintains a significant asset management business there with former executives of Brinson Partners.

History

Early history at First Chicago
Gary P. Brinson joined the trust department of First National Bank of Chicago as chief investment officer in 1979. By 1981, Brinson had assembled the team that would become First Chicago Advisors and later Brinson Partners.

First Chicago Advisors became a separate money management company in 1983. Through the 1980s, Brinson established himself as a pioneer in the development of the theory of asset allocation Brinson pushed for allocation across stocks, bonds, cash, real estate, venture capital and other alternative asset classes using simple cost effective investment strategies. This would largely become conventional wisdom among money managers in the 1990s.

Independence and acquisition
In 1989, Gary Brinson led a US$100 million management buyout of his firm from First Chicago Corporation, acquiring approximately 75% of the company with a large group of partners and investors. Over the next five years built up the firm to approximately US$36 billion of assets under management. Brinson focused on providing access for U.S. institutions to global markets. The firm, which also managed a series of mutual funds, had emerged as one of largest managers of pension plans in the U.S.

In 1994, Swiss Bank Corporation was in the midst of a series of acquisitions that included O'Connor & Associates, S.G. Warburg & Co., Dillon Read & Co. and culminated in the bank's merger with the Union Bank of Swtizerland in 1998. Swiss Bank announced the acquisition of Brinson Partners and brought in Brinson to run the bank's asset management unit. Swiss Bank Corporation paid US$750 million to acquire Brinson Partners, resulting in a profit to Brinson and his partners of US$460 million on the sale of their 75% stake in the company.

Following the acquisition of Brinson Partners, Gary Brinson ran Swiss Bank's asset management business and after the merger with UBS, Brinson was named chief investment officer of UBS Asset Management.

UBS Asset Management

Since the merger of UBS and SBC in 1998, UBS has been among the largest asset management firms in the world.  The merger and subsequent restructuring resulted in the combination of three major asset management operations: UBS Asset Management, Phillips & Drew (owned by Union Bank of Switzerland) and Brinson Partners (owned by Swiss Bank Corporation).  The investment teams were merged in 2000 and in 2002 the brands were consolidated as UBS Asset Management.

As of 2014, UBS Asset Management was responsible for CHF 664 billion of invested assets across its various asset classes and investment strategies.   With around 3,800 employees in 24 countries, UBS Asset Management is largest mutual fund manager in Switzerland and one of the largest manager of fund of hedge funds and real estate investment managers in the world. It has major offices in Chicago, Frankfurt, Hartford, Hong Kong, London, New York, Singapore, Sydney, Tokyo and Zurich.

References

External links
 The Brinson Foundation - non-profit organization supporting educational, public health and scientific research programs

UBS
Investment management companies of the United States
Financial services companies established in 1989
Companies based in Chicago
Defunct financial services companies of the United States
Financial services companies disestablished in 1994